Haskel LaVon Stanback (born March 19, 1952) is a former professional American football player who played running back for seven seasons for  the Atlanta Falcons. He was selected in the fifth round of the 1974 NFL Draft by the Cincinnati Bengals after attending the University of Tennessee. After his football career, he began work with Norfolk Southern Corporation, and is Superintendent of its Virginia Division in Roanoke.

References

1952 births
Living people
American football running backs
Atlanta Falcons players
Tennessee Volunteers football players
Players of American football from North Carolina
People from Kannapolis, North Carolina